Bengali Braille is used for the Bengali language. According to UNESCO (2013), there are slight different braille conventions for Bengali language in India, where the generic Bharati Braille is followed, and in Bangladesh. This article compares Bengali Braille in the two countries.

Bengali Braille chart

Vowel Alphabets

Consonant Alphabets

Codas (Script modifiers)

Numerals

Punctuation marks

See also
Bharati braille

References

Bharati braille alphabets
Bengali language